Dunster is a village, civil parish and former manor in Somerset, England.

Dunster may also refer to:
 Dunster, British Columbia, Canada
 Dunster Castle, a country house in Dunster, Somerset, England
 Dunster House, a dormitory at Harvard University, US
 Dunster, a 1992 novel by John Mortimer

People with the Surname
 Bill Dunster (born 1960), British architect
 Charles Dunster (1750–1816), British writer and translator
 Chinmaya Dunster (born 1954), English musician and environmentalist
 Frank Dunster (1921–1995), Canadian ice hockey player
 Henry Dunster (1609–1658/9), Anglo-American Puritan clergyman and first president of Harvard College
 Henry Dunster (MP) (1618–1684), English merchant and politician
 Matthew Dunster, English theatre director, playwright and actor
 Robin Dunster (born 1944), Australian nurse and chief of staff of Salvation Army International
 Tomy Dunster, Argentinian actor